Ahuravak (also Romanized as Āhūravak) is a village in Babuyi Rural District, Basht District, Basht County, Kohgiluyeh and Boyer-Ahmad Province, Iran. At the 2006 census, its population was 73, in 18 families.

References 

Populated places in Basht County